The Europe/Africa Zone was one of the three zones of the regional Davis Cup competition in 1996.

In the Europe/Africa Zone there were three different tiers, called groups, in which teams competed against each other to advance to the upper tier. Winners in Group I advanced to the World Group Qualifying Round, along with losing teams from the World Group first round. Teams who lost in the first round competed in the relegation play-offs, with winning teams remaining in Group I, whereas teams who lost their play-offs were relegated to the Europe/Africa Zone Group II in 1997.

Participating nations

Draw

 and  relegated to Group II in 1997.

First round

Israel vs. Norway

Second round

Morocco vs. Zimbabwe

Finland vs. Romania

Croatia vs. Ukraine

Israel vs. Spain

Second round relegation play-offs

Zimbabwe vs. Finland

Ukraine vs. Norway

References

External links
Davis Cup official website

Davis Cup Europe/Africa Zone
Europe Africa Zone Group I